The Canadian Open, also known as the Canada Masters, and currently branded as the National Bank Open presented by Rogers for sponsorship reasons, is an annual tennis tournament held in Ontario and Quebec. The men's competition is a Masters 1000 event on the ATP Tour, and the women's competition is a WTA 1000 tournament on the WTA Tour. The competition is played on outdoor hard courts.

Prior to 2011, they were held during separate weeks in the July–August period; now the two competitions are held during the same week in August. The events alternate from year to year between the cities of Montreal and Toronto. Since 2021 in even-numbered years the men's tournament is held in Montreal, while the women's tournament is held in Toronto, and vice versa in odd-numbered years. The Toronto tournament is held at Sobeys Stadium and the Montreal tournament is held at IGA Stadium.

The current singles champions as of 2022 are Pablo Carreño Busta (def. Hubert Hurkacz) and Simona Halep (def. Beatriz Haddad Maia).

History

The men's tournament began in July 1881, and was held at the Toronto Lawn Tennis Club, while the women's competition was first held in 1892. Of the extant tennis tournaments in the world today, only Wimbledon has been around longer.

Prior to 1968 the tournament was known as the Canadian National Championships. Between 1970 and 1989 it was a major event of the Grand Prix Tennis Tour as part of the Grand Prix Super Series between 1972 and 1973, 1978–1989. The tournament was sponsored for a number of years by tobacco brands. In the 1970s, Rothmans International was the chief sponsor, followed by Player's Limited in the 1980s, and then Du Maurier from 1997 to 2000. However, Canadian federal legislation then came into effect banning tobacco advertising. Rogers Communications, a Canadian communications and media company, took over as the new presenting sponsor.

The event was played on clay until 1979 when it switched permanently to hard courts. Both the men's and women's tournaments were played as a single combined tournament at the National Tennis Centre in Toronto until 1981, when the men's tournament was played at the Jarry Park Stadium in Montreal for the first time. Similarly 1982 was the first year in which the women's tournament was played in Montreal.

In 1989, two Canadian male tennis players, Grant Connell and Andrew Sznajder, reached the quarterfinals of the event. They were eliminated by Ivan Lendl and Andre Agassi during that round. Lendl went on to defeat Agassi in the semi-finals and John McEnroe in the finals of that edition. Lendl has been the tournament's most successful singles player, reaching the final nine times and winning the title in 1980, 1981, 1983, 1987, 1988, and 1989.

In 1995, Andre Agassi and Pete Sampras met in the final, the third of the four times that the two top-ranked men's players would meet that year, after the Australian Open and Indian Wells Masters. Agassi's tournament win helped him regain the number-one ranking, which he lost to Sampras after they played each other again at the US Open.

du Maurier Open 
In 1997, the Canadian federal government introduced legislation restricting the ability of tobacco companies from sponsoring sporting events. The tournament was faced with losing its title sponsor, and eventually du Maurier was replaced.

Canada Masters 
In 2000, International Sport and Leisure signed a 10-year agreement with the ATP Tour for all Masters series events, including the men's tournament. Rogers and AT&T Canada became the title sponsors for the women's event in 2001. ISL went bankrupt, leaving the men's tournament without a sponsor. Serena Williams won the women's tournament for the first time, defeating top-seeded and previous winner Jennifer Capriati. In 2004, the tournament became part of the US Open Series, in the build-up to the US Open grand slam tournament. The women's tournament was moved to just before the US Open grand slam tournament. Consequently, top players sometimes withdrew from the tournament at the last minute to rest for the upcoming US Open.

Rogers Cup 
In 2005, Rogers Communications became the title sponsor for the men's tournament. It was already the sponsor for the women's event, and both events became known as the Rogers Cup. Rafael Nadal won the men's tournament for his first time, defeating three-time champion Andre Agassi. In 2007, Novak Djokovic won the men's tournament for the first time, becoming the first man to defeat both Nadal and Roger Federer in the same event.

In 2009, WTA CEO Stacey Allaster implemented rules reclassifying the women's event as a Premier 5 event, which guaranteed at least seven of the top ten players. The WTA's rules required each year-end top-10 player from 2008 to participate in at least four Premier 5 tournaments in the 2009 season, or face the threat of fines or docked ranking points. Consequently, 19 of the top 20 female players took part in the 2009 Rogers Cup draw. The ATP mandated participation for the men's tournament as a "1000-level" series event.

Beginning in 2011, the men's and women's tournaments were held during the same week, with each event alternating between Montreal and Toronto.

Bianca Andreescu won the women's tournament in 2019, becoming the first Canadian to win the tournament since Faye Urban in 1969.

In 2020, the men's and women's tournaments were postponed to 2021 due to the COVID-19 pandemic.

National Bank Open 
On February 2, 2021, Tennis Canada announced that National Bank would become the title sponsor of the tournament under a 10-year agreement, renaming it the National Bank Open. Rogers remained as the presenting sponsor.

Event titles

Past finals

Men's singles

Women's singles

Men's doubles

Women's doubles

Records
Source: The Tennis Base

Men's singles

References

External links

 Official website
 ATP tournament profile
 Official Rogers Cup live streaming

 
Tennis tournaments in Canada
Hard court tennis tournaments
WTA Tour
US Open Series
Recurring sporting events established in 1881
ATP Tour Masters 1000
1881 establishments in Canada